Today,​​ environmental problems in the Philippines include pollution, illegal mining and logging, deforestation, threats to environmental activists, dynamite fishing, landslides, coastal erosion, biodiversity loss, extinction, global warming and climate change. Due to the paucity of extant documents, a complete history of land use in the archipelago remains unwritten. However, relevant data shows destructive land use increased significantly in the eighteenth century when Spanish colonialism enhanced its extraction of the archipelago's resources for the early modern global market. The Philippines is projected to be one of the most vulnerable countries to the impacts of climate change, which would exacerbate weather extremes. As The Philippines lies on the Pacific Ring of Fire, it is prone to natural disasters, like earthquakes, typhoons, and volcanic eruptions. In 2021, the Philippines ranked the fourth most affected country from "weather-related loss events", partly due to the close proximity of major infrastructure and residential areas to the coast and unreliable government support. One of the most devastating typhoons to hit the archipelago was Typhoon Haiyan, known locally as Yolanda, in 2013 that killed 6,300 people and left 28,689 injured. Philippine politicians have demonstrated awareness of environmental crises with the passing of policies like The Clean Air Act of 1999, the Philippine Clean Water Act of 2004, the Climate Change Act of 2009, and participation in the Paris Agreement. However, research has found that outside of cities, the general public doesn't feel equally informed. Environmental activists and land defenders, consisting mostly of Indigenous communities who have been attempting to bring attention to the environmental issues in the country have been met with violence or murder. As a result, the Philippines has been ranked one of the most dangerous places in the world for environmental activists.

Water pollution

Although water resources have become scarce in some regions and seasons, the Philippines as a whole has more than enough surface and groundwater. However, neglecting to have a coherent environmental policy has led to the contamination of 58% of the groundwater in the Philippines. The main source of pollution is untreated domestic and industrial wastewater. Only one third of Philippine river systems are considered suitable for public water supply.

It is estimated that in 2025, water availability will be marginal in most major cities and in 8 of the 19 major river basins. Besides severe health concerns, water pollution also leads to problems in the fishing and tourism industries. The national government recognized the problem and since 2004 has sought to introduce sustainable water resources development management (see below).

Only 5% of the total population is connected to a sewer network. The vast majority uses flush toilets connected to septic tanks. Since sludge treatment and disposal facilities are rare, most effluents are discharged without treatment. According to the Asian Development Bank, the Pasig River is one of the world's most polluted rivers, running through the capital city of Manila. In March 2008, Manila Water announced that a wastewater treatment plant will be constructed in Taguig. The first Philippine constructed wetland serving about 700 households was completed in 2006 in a peri-urban area of Bayawan which has been used to resettle families that lived along the coast in informal settlements and had no access to safe water supply and sanitation facilities.

According to a report in 2003, the Pasig River is one of the most polluted rivers in the world with 150 tons of domestic waste and 75 tons of industrial waste dumped daily.

Deforestation

Over the course of the twentieth century, the forest cover of the Philippines dropped from 70 percent down to 20 percent. In total, 46 species are endangered, and 4 have been eradicated completely. Only 3.2 percent of total rainforest is left. Based on an analysis of land use pattern maps and a road map, an estimated 9.8 million acres of forests were lost in the Philippines from 1934 to 1988. Illegal logging occurs in the Philippines and intensifies flood damage in some areas.

According to scholar Jessica Mathews, short-sighted policies by the Filipino government have contributed to the high rate of deforestation:
The government regularly granted logging concessions of less than ten years. Since it takes 30–35 years for a second-growth forest to mature, loggers had no incentive to replant. Compounding the error, flat royalties encouraged the loggers to remove only the most valuable species. A horrendous 40 percent of the harvestable lumber never left the forests but, having been damaged in the logging, rotted or was burned in place. The unsurprising result of these and related policies is that out of 17 million hectares of closed forests that flourished early in the century only 1.2 million remain today.

The Philippines had a 2018 Forest Landscape Integrity Index mean score of 5.91/10, ranking it 91st globally out of 172 countries.

Air pollution

Air pollution causes significant health and economic problems in the Philippines. Due to industrial waste and automobiles, Manila suffers from air pollution, affecting 98% of the population. Annually, the air pollution causes more than 4,000 deaths. Ermita is Manila's most air polluted district due to open dump sites and industrial waste.

The Department of Environment and Natural Resources is tasked with implementing the Clean Air Act of 1999 to monitor and prevent air pollution in the country.

Solid waste 

According to Metro Manila Development Authority (MMDA), the country produces an average of 41 kilotons of garbage daily with almost 10 ktons/day coming from Metro Manila alone.

While most local government units establish a Material Recovery Facility (MRF), implement segregation at the source, and collect and process all recyclable and biodegradable materials, most of the municipal solid wastes are either disposed in the dump sites or openly burned, which further worsen the quality of heavy polluted air in the cities.

Destructive fishing

General 
Commercial fishing is causing environmental problems, exhausting food supply, and threatening livelihoods in the Philippines and around the world. The Philippines has a strong fishing culture due to its historically productive and diverse marine ecosystems. In 2018, 927,617 people were officially reported as being involved in "capture fishing", and fish contributes to 50% of a Filipinos protein consumption. This fish reliance has contributed to the current overfishing of 70% of Philippine fishing grounds and about 40% of fish caught being done illegally. Coastal communities and local fishers organized themselves to implement sustainable fishing practices and protect fishing grounds from commercial fishing fleets that are destroying marine habitats.

COVID-19 lockdowns seem to have allowed an increase in illegal fishing. Karagatan Patrol ships using VIIRS (visible infrared imaging lure lights) have detected an increase in apparent commercial fishing vessels from 3,602 in February 2020 (before COVID-19 lockdowns) to 5,950 in March, which went back down to 1,666 in May when lockdown eased. These vessels were detected in waters that only allow small artisanal fishermen using passive fishing methods, due to the area being a spawning ground for most fish species.

Dynamite and cyanide fishing 
Dynamite fishing, cyanide fishing, and bottom trawling are fishing methods that cause extensive damage to coral reefs. These practices are major threats to Philippine marine life and ecosystems.

Dynamite fishing, also known as blast fishing and fish bombing, was outlawed in 1932. It is a practice of throwing bombs into the water to kill and stun the fish caught in the blast, and then collecting the fish. The process kills both fish eggs and fish too young to sell. It also destroys the surrounding habitat, including coral reefs in the area. This damage is estimated to have cause $99.2 billion in losses a year, according to a study by Rhodora Azanza of the University of the Philippines. As such, average fish yields have been reported to be decreasing. Jimely Flores, a senior marine scientist for Oceana, described the situation saying, “In some dynamited areas, if you dive you don’t see any fish at all.”

Commercial fishing vessels have used cyanide to stun and capture coral reef fish in the Philippines.

Climate change

Environmentalism

Anti-nuclear movement

Threats to environmentalists 
The Philippines is sometimes considered the most dangerous country for environmental activists. According to environmental watchdog Global Witness, at least 30 land and environmental defenders were killed in the Philippines in 2018, many of whom were in conflict with private business groups. Kalikasan People's Network for the Environment recorded 46 deaths in 2019. The group said activists have also been harassed, vilified, "red-tagged," and labeled as terrorists or "enemies of the state."

Environmental groups have asked Congress to pass a Human Rights Defenders Bill to help protect activists and their families.

Government policy

Environmental protection 
The Department of Environment and Natural Resources is responsible for creating, supporting, and enforcing policies on environmental protection by the Philippine government. The department is also tasked with ensuring sustainable management of the Philippines' natural resources. The Philippine Environmental Management Bureau (EMB) is responsible for environmental impact assessments, pollution prevention and control, as well as enforcing six main environmental laws in the Philippines. The Philippines has also signed into several international environmental treaties, with CITES protecting species from overexploitation due to international trade, and ratified the Paris Agreement.

Sustainable development 
Recognizing the need to tackle the environment issues as well as the need to sustain development and growth, the Philippines came up with the Sustainable Development Strategy. The nation for the Sustainable Development Strategy includes assimilating environmental considerations in administration, apposite pricing of natural resources, conservation of biodiversity, rehabilitation of ecosystems, control of population growth and human resources development, inducing growth in rural areas, promotion of environmental education, strengthening citizens’ participation, and promoting small to medium-sized enterprises and sustainable agricultural and forestry practices. One of the initiatives signed in part of the strategy was the 1992 Earth Summit.

Upon signing the 1992 Earth Summit, the government of Philippines has been constantly looking into many different initiatives to improve the environmental aspects of the country.

Writ of Kalikasan

Clean Air Act 
Republic Act No. 8749, also known as the Philippine Clean Air Act of 1999, mandates the government to create and implement a national program for preventing and managing air pollution. The law also tasks the government to monitor air quality throughout the country. The  Department of Environment and Natural Resources issued Administrative Order No. 81 in 2000 outlining its implementing rules and regulations for the Clean Air Act. It also issued in 2004 Administrative Order No. 2004-26 amending Rule XIX of DENR Administrative Order No. 2000-81.

See also 
Ecoregions in the Philippines
List of protected areas of the Philippines

Species:
Wildlife of the Philippines
List of threatened species of the Philippines

References

Further reading